Jamal Amofa (born 25 November 1998) is a Dutch professional footballer who plays as a defender for Eredivisie club Go Ahead Eagles.

Career
Amofa signed his first professional contract with ADO Den Haag on 29 June 2020.

On 5 July 2022, Amofa joined Eredivisie club Go Ahead Eagles on a three-year contract.

Personal life 
Born in the Netherlands, Amofa is of Ghanaian, and Surinamese descent.

References

External links

 Career stats & Profile - Voetbal International

1998 births
Living people
Dutch footballers
Dutch sportspeople of Ghanaian descent
Dutch sportspeople of Surinamese descent
Association football defenders
ADO Den Haag players
Go Ahead Eagles players
Eredivisie players
Eerste Divisie players